Zagrammosoma is a genus of hymenopteran insects of the family Eulophidae. They parasitize Lepidoptera and Diptera leafmining larvae.

References
Key to Nearctic eulophid genera
Universal Chalcidoidea Database

External links
Bugguide.net

Eulophidae